Yuri Pavlovich Moroz (September 29, 1956, Krasnodon, Ukrainian SSR) is a Soviet and Russian film director, actor, scriptwriter, producer.

Biography 
His father worked as an electrician at the Zasyadko mine, the mother of the surgeon. Year I studied in Donetsk vocational school. In 1975 he went to Moscow. In 1979 he graduated Moscow Art Theater School. He became an actor of the Lenkom Theatre. In the troupe of this theater, the actor worked until 1987.

In the cinema, Yuri Moroz made his debut in the historical two-part film of Sergei Gerasimov's 'The Youth of Peter the Great' and 'At the Beginning of Glorious Days'. In 1988, Yuri Moroz graduated from the directing department of VGIK.

His debut as a director was a fantastic film based on the novel by Kir Bulychyov 'The Witches Cave', released in 1990. In 1992 he put a detective picture of the 'Black Square, acting as a screenwriter as well.

Since 1993, since the founding, Moroz a president of the Association of Young Cinematographers.

In 2006 he founded the film company 'Moroz Film', specializing in the production of television and full-length feature films, the first of which was the film 'The Spot' (2006). The film won the Silver hugo Award for the main female roles (Darya Moroz, Viktoriya Isakova, Anna Ukolova) at the Chicago International Film Festival. Produced the film Wolfhound.

The next stage was the filming of the television movie 'The Brothers Karamazov' (2007), where Yuri Moroz acted as producer and director of the film. In 2007, he was one of the producers of the series 'Liquidation' directed by Sergei Ursuliak.

I removed the classic detective story of Boris Akunin's best-selling book 'Pelagia and the White Bulldog'.

In 2012, Yuri Moroz, together with Dmitry Kharatyan, with the support of the Film Foundation and the Renova Foundation, began shooting a fantasy film based on the novel by Dmitry Poletayev 'Fort Ross: In Search of Adventure'.

Selected filmography
Actor
 At the Beginning of Glorious Days as Alyosha Brovkin (В начале славных дел, 1980)
 The Youth of Peter the Great as Alyosha Brovkin (Юность Петра, 1980)
 The Circus Princess as Tony (Принцесса цирка, 1982)
 Boys as Kostya (Пацаны, 1983)
 Mary Poppins, Goodbye as Postman (Мэри Поппинс, до свидания!, 1983)
 Visit to Minotaur as Paolo Stradivari (Визит к Минотавру, 1987)
Director
 The Witches Cave (Подземелье ведьм, 1990)
 Gold Diggers (Содержанки, 2019)
Producer
 Wolfhound (Волкодав из рода Серых Псов, 2006)
 Once Upon a Time in the Provinces (Однажды в провинции, 2008)
 The Ghost (Домовой, 2008)

Personal life
 First wife is Marina Levtova (1959-2000), an actress. Killed in 2000.
 Daughter   Darya Moroz (born September 1, 1983), theater and film actress.
 Second wife is Viktoriya Isakova (born October 12, 1976), an actress of theater and cinema.
Yuri Moroz is the godfather of Ivan Kharatyan, son of Dmitry Kharatyan.

References

External links
 

1956 births
Living people
Soviet male film actors
Soviet film directors
Soviet stage actors
Russian film directors
Soviet screenwriters
20th-century Russian screenwriters
Male screenwriters
20th-century Russian male writers
Russian film producers
Gerasimov Institute of Cinematography alumni
Moscow Art Theatre School alumni
People from Krasnodon